Massiea is a genus of leaf beetles in the subfamily Eumolpinae. It is known from Asia.

Species
 Massiea bacboensis Medvedev, 2018
 Massiea chouioi (Chen, 1940)
 Massiea cinnamomi (Chen & Wang, 1976)
 Massiea costata (Chen & Wang, 1976)
 Massiea cribrata (Chen, 1940)
 Massiea cyanipennis Lefèvre, 1893
 Massiea cylindrica (Chûjô, 1938)
 Massiea glabrata (Tan, 1982)
 Massiea gracilis (Chen, 1940)
 Massiea sangzhiensis (Tan, 1992)
 Massiea splendida (Tan, 1992)

References

Chrysomelidae genera
Eumolpinae
Beetles of Asia
Taxa named by Édouard Lefèvre